The Diamond Chariot (the Russian term for the "Diamond Vehicle" (kongōjō) school of Tantric Buddhism) is a historical mystery novel by internationally acclaimed Russian detective story writer Boris Akunin, published originally in 2003. It is the tenth novel in Akunin's Erast Fandorin series of historical detective novels.  As with all of the other Fandorin novels, The Diamond Chariot was hugely successful in Russia, selling out its first printing of 200,000 copies in a week.

The Diamond Chariot is available in English since September 2011 from Orion Books, translated by Andrew Bromfield.

Overview
The novel consists of two volumes. In the first one, Dragonfly-Catcher—set in Russia during the Russo-Japanese War in 1905, Fandorin is charged with protecting the Trans-Siberian Railway from Japanese sabotage. In the second volume, Between the Lines—set in Japan in 1878 and 1879, the story of Fandorin's arrival and life in Yokohama is told, including the encounter with his servant Masa and finding a Ninjutsu teacher.

The first volume is structured as a haiku, with each chapter corresponding to a syllable, while in the second part, a haiku is placed at the end of each chapter.

Adaptation
 In 2012, the author, Boris Akunin has announced in his own blog that the book will be adapted into TV series, that will be produced by Central Partnership. Sergey Ursulyak is set to direct the series.

References

External links
Etext, in Russian, of The Diamond Chariot
Review

2003 novels
Novels by Boris Akunin
Novels set in Russia
Fiction set in 1905
Novels set in Japan
Fiction set in 1878
Fiction set in 1879
21st-century Russian novels
Russian historical novels
Russian detective novels
Japan in non-Japanese culture